The Melbourne Free University (or MFU) is an alternative university created in Melbourne in 2009.

Principles

The Melbourne Free University is committed to radical equality. Its principles listed on its website include:

 the a priori belief in universal equality
 the combination of academic rigour with open discussions on an equal basis and the withdrawal of the division master/student.
 gratuity and accessibility. the MFU is run on the principle 'no money in, no money out'.
 political and economic autonomy.
 the belief in people's responsibility to seek and engage with knowledge.
 the necessity to offer an alternative to the current education system, judged exclusive and outcome oriented.
 the belief in offering knowledge for its own sake.

Principles are explained in more detail in an article published in The National Times.

Its principles are partly inspired by the works of Jacques Rancière.

Its motto is THINK. DISCUSS. ACT.

Founding Members

This project was co-founded by three colleagues from La Trobe University: Dr. Gerhard Hoffstaedter, social anthropologist; Dr. Aurelien Mondon, researcher in politics; and Jasmine-Kim Westendorf, PhD candidate in politics.

Second Term 2011

Courses proliferated across a range of disciplines, including law, indigenous studies, refugee studies and a course on 'what if' - re-imagining how the world could be. Special seminars have included topics such as sexuality, gender studies, myths, aesthetics and others.

In summer 2011/2012 the MFU is cooperating with Occupy Melbourne for a course  at City Square on issues relating to the global Occupy movement.

First Term 2011

I (heart) Philosophy

WEDNESDAYS 6.30-8pm
@Dexter Cafe and Bar, 123 Queens Pde, Clifton Hill

week 1 – 16/02/11:
Freud and insecurity
(John Cash, University of Melbourne)

week 2 – 23/02/11:
On Derrida and Hospitality
(Jack Reynolds, La Trobe University)

week 3 – 02/03/11:
On Popper and the Margins of Science
(Gerhard Wiesenfeldt, Melbourne University)

week 4 – 09/03/11:
On Communism / Žižek and Negri
(Jessica Whyte, Monash University)

week 5 – 16/03/11:
On Nietzsche and the body
(Philipa Rothfield, La Trobe University)

week 6 – 21/03/11:
On Badiou and Education
(Adam Bartlett, University of Melbourne)

Racism in the 21st century

THURSDAYS 6.30-8pm
@the North Carlton Railway Station Neighbourhood House, 20 Solly Ave (near Park St), North Carlton

week 1 – 17/02/11:
Racism: a Brief History
(Aurelien Mondon, La Trobe University)

week 2 – 24/02/11:
Indigeneity, Whiteness, and the Politics of Anti-racism
(Emma Kowal, University of Melbourne)

week 3 – 03/03/11:
Fair Dinkum Fascism: Race and the Contemporary Australian Far Right
(TBC)

week 4 – 10/03/11:
Islam in Australia
(Shakira Hussein, University of Melbourne)

week 5 – 14/03/11 (Wednesday instead of Thursday):
On Racialised Sexual Exploitation
(Sheila Jeffreys, University of Melbourne)

week 6 – 22/03/11: (Tuesday instead of Thursday):
The Impact of Racism in Australia
(Yin Paradies, University of Melbourne)

First Semester 2010

For its first semester, the Melbourne Free University offered four seminars.

On 1 May 2010, two seminars were given on Australia's Role in the World and Race Relations in Australia.

On 5 June 2010, two more seminars were given on Universal Differences? and Religious Truth Claims.

These four seminars were organised to gauge the interest the project would trigger.

Second Semester 2010

The second semester, which started in August 2010 is divided into four 6-weeks courses.

Australian Identities?

The first one was entitled Australian Identities?

It was coordinated by Aurelien Mondon.

Lecturers and speakers included Aurelien Mondon, Russell Marks, Pamela Curr, Gary Foley and Malcolm Farnsworth.

Sustainability and Permaculture

The second course, ran in parallel, was entitled Sustainability and Permaculture.

It was coordinated by Jasmine-Kim Westendorf.

Lecturers and speakers included Ruby Murray, Andrew Foran, Christian Monahan, Susannah Powell, Catherine Johnston and Jodi Newcombe.

I (heart) Philosophy

The third course, which started on 29 September 2010, is entitled I (heart) Philosophy.

It is coordinated by Jasmine-Kim Westendorf and Gerhard Hoffstaedter.

Lecturers and speakers include Aurelien Mondon, Miriam Bankovsky, Christopher Cordner, Justin Clemens, Michael Elligate, Gregory McCormick.

The Asia-Pacific and Us: Australia in the Region

The fourth course, which started on 30 September 2010, is entitled The Asia-Pacific and Us: Australia in the Region.

It is coordinated by Gerhard Hoffstaedter and Michael Webber.

Lecturers and speakers include Jasmine-Kim Westendorf, Deb Chapman, Gerhard Hoffstaedter, Andrew Kingsford and Michael Webber.

Recordings

To improve accessibility to the courses, the Melbourne Free University publishes the recordings of the lectures on its website.

Publications

Various articles have been published following the lectures given at the Melbourne Free University.

Aurélien Mondon, Education is not just about getting a job, The National Times, 4 June 2010,

Aurélien Mondon, Do people really want what politicians are offering?, The National Times, 8 July 2010,

Aurélien Mondon, A Free University for Melbourne, July 2010.

Gerhard Hoffstaedter, Hub of turmoil thrives in Asia, The Canberra Times, 1 July 2010,

Russell Marks,  Labor no longer party of progressive nationalism, 19 August 2010

Gerhard Hoffstaedter, People must be able to feel at home here, 1 October 2010

Venues

Lectures are held at several Melbourne venues:

Dexter Cafe (123 Queens Parade, Clifton Hill), North Carlton Railway Station Neighbourhood House (20 Solly Ave, North Carlton), City Square, Cnr Swanston & Collins Street, The Red Wheelbarrow Bookshop, 105 Lygon St, Brunswick East and The Alderman (upstairs gallery) 134 Lygon St, East Brunswick.

References

External links
 Aurelien Mondon, Education is not just about getting a job, 'The National Times',  

Universities in Victoria (Australia)
Universities in Melbourne
Free universities